Willoughby, an electoral district of the Legislative Assembly in the Australian state of New South Wales. The district has had four incarnations, the first from 1894 to 1904, the second from 1913 to 1920, the third from 1927 to 1988, and the fourth from 1991 to the present.


Members for Willoughby

Election results

Elections in the 2020s

2022 by-election

Elections in the 2010s

2019

2015

2011

Elections in the 2000s

2007

2003

Elections in the 1990s

1999

1995

1991

Elections in the 1980s

1984

1981

Elections in the 1970s

1978

1976

1973

1971

Elections in the 1960s

1968

1965

1962

Elections in the 1950s

1959

1956

1953

1950

Elections in the 1940s

1947

1944

1943 by-election

1941

Elections in the 1930s

1938

1935

1932

1930

Elections in the 1920s

1927
This section is an excerpt from 1927 New South Wales state election § Willoughby

1920 - 1927

Elections in the 1910s

1917
This section is an excerpt from 1917 New South Wales state election § Willoughby

1915 by-election

1913
This section is an excerpt from 1913 New South Wales state election § Willoughby

1904 - 1913

Elections in the 1900s

1903 by-election

1901

Elections in the 1890s

1898
This section is an excerpt from 1898 New South Wales colonial election § Willoughby

1895
This section is an excerpt from 1895 New South Wales colonial election § Willoughby

1894 by-election

1894

Notes

References

New South Wales state electoral results by district